Rafael Francisco Martínez Sáinz (September 29, 1935 – November 6, 2016) was a Roman Catholic bishop.

Ordained to the priesthood in 1959, Martinez Sáinz served as auxiliary bishop of the Roman Catholic Archdiocese of Guadalajara, Mexico, from 2002 to 2012.

Notes

1935 births
2016 deaths
21st-century Roman Catholic bishops in Mexico